Piano Sonata No. 13 in E-flat major, Op. 27 No. 1, "", is a sonata composed by Ludwig van Beethoven in 1800–1801.

Composition and publication

Beethoven was about 30 years old when he wrote the sonata. He had already made a name for himself in Vienna as pianist and composer and was beginning to explore alternatives to the classical-era compositional procedures that he had largely adhered to during the 18th century. The most famous works of his "middle period", often emphasizing heroism, were yet to come.

Beethoven's sketches for the first, second, and final movements survive, but the original autograph copy is lost. The sonata was published separately from its more famous companion, Op. 27 No. 2 (the "Moonlight" Sonata), but at the same time, by Cappi in Vienna; the first advertisements for the work appeared 3 March 1802. Both Op. 27 sonatas were originally titled .

The dedicatee of the work was (as was typical of the time) an aristocrat, Princess Josephine von Liechtenstein. Little is known of Beethoven's relationship with her.

Quasi una fantasia

Grove Music Online translates the Italian title  as "sonata in the manner of a fantasy". While we cannot know precisely why Beethoven used this description for the two Op. 27 sonatas, several explanations are available. In the case of the present work (though not its companion), the entire sonata is played continuously without pauses between movements, in the manner of most fantasias. The movements are not in the usual order for a sonata: the opening movement is a slow movement and the scherzo and slow movement are in inverted order. The first movement is not in sonata form, as is true for most sonatas. As Kenneth Drake has pointed out, the movements are in extreme contrast with each other, a common trait of the sections of a fantasia. Lastly, the appearance of a quotation from one movement within another (here, from the third movement within the fourth) is a form of freedom not ordinarily employed in classical sonatas.

Several of these patterns are mentioned in Lewis Lockwood's discussion of the aesthetics of Beethoven's "" works:

Movements

The Op. 27 No. 1 sonata is laid out in four movements:
However, the work is meant to be performed from beginning to end.

First movement 

The first movement is in five-part rondo form (also called a square tune) instead of sonata form, unusual for Beethoven. The tempo is slow, interrupted by a fast medial section in the submediant, C major.

Second movement 

The second movement is a scherzo and is in ternary form (the norm for scherzi). Beethoven specifically notates the first phrase to start in the second bar. The main theme consists of mostly quarter notes in parallel octaves. Inside the theme, the first 16 bars are repeated outside an 8-bar middle strain. When it returns following the trio section, the left hand plays staccato and the notes of the right hand part (still legato) are offset half a beat later. The movement includes a brief coda and concludes on the chord C major, a Picardy third.

Third movement 

The third movement is slow in tempo and features a lyrical, noble theme, set against an eighth note accompaniment (in the recapitulation, sixteenth notes). The movement does not conclude in its tonic key, but instead reaches a final cadenza (on the dominant seventh) that leads directly to the finale. The movement is brief and thus might be heard by some listeners as an introduction to the final movement rather than as an independent movement, as Jonathan Del Mar suggests.

Fourth movement 

The finale is the most extended movement of the work. Charles Rosen notes, "With this movement, Beethoven began an experiment, to which he continued to return and develop through the years, of displacing some of the weight of the work from the opening movement to the finale". The work is in fast tempo and in sonata rondo form. In the coda section, the main theme of the slow movement briefly returns, followed by a brief cadenza. There follows a short final section, marked Presto, based on a tightly compressed version of the main theme.

A typical performance of the work lasts 15 minutes.

Notes

References
Gordon, Stewart (2005) Editorial matter to his edition of the Beethoven piano sonatas, Volume II. Alfred Music Publishing.
Jones, Timothy (1999) The "Moonlight" and other sonatas, Op. 27 and Op. 31. Cambridge: Cambridge University Press.
Lockwood, Lewis (1996) "Reshaping the genre: Beethoven's piano sonatas from Op. 22 to Op. 28 (1799–1801)". Israeli Studies in Musicology 6: 1–16.
Marson, Nicholas (2000) "The sense of an ending": goal directedness in Beethoven's music. In Glenn Stanley, ed., The Cambridge Companion to Beethoven. Cambridge: Cambridge University Press.
Rosen, Charles (2002) Beethoven's Piano Sonatas: A Short Companion. New Haven: Yale University press.
Sisman, Elaine (1998) "After the heroic style: 'fantasias' and the characteristic sonatas of 1809". In Stanley, Glenn (1998) Beethoven Forum VI. University of Nebraska Press.

External links
 , including the first edition.
 A lecture by András Schiff on Beethoven's piano sonata Op. 27, No. 1
 Piano Sonata No. 13 in E-flat major, Op. 27, No.1, Musopen
 European Archive Copyright free LP recording of the Sonata No. 13, Op. 27, No.1 in E-flat major by Hugo Steurer, piano at the European Archive (for non-American viewers only).

Piano Sonata 13
1801 compositions
Beethoven
Music with dedications